The Upland–Ontario Line is a former Pacific Electric streetcar line in San Bernardino County, California. Cars did not travel to Downtown Los Angeles and instead provided a local service between Ontario and Upland with through service to Pomona.

History

Pacific Electric acquired the Ontario and San Antonio Heights Railroad Company on April 13, 1912, bringing their Euclid Avenue Line in Upland as well as their branch to Ponoma into the interurban network. Connections to main line steam trains were made at Ontario Southern Pacific Station. The Ontario–Upland Line was officially interlined with service to Pomona via North Pomona until 1918, after which Pacific Electric no longer advertised the route as such. The line operated with an irregular schedule between Ontario and Upland until service was abandoned after October 6, 1928.

References

Bibliography

 

Pacific Electric routes
1912 establishments in California
Railway services discontinued in 1928
1926 disestablishments in California
Closed railway lines in the United States